is a former Japanese football player.

Playing career
Furushima was born in Yatsushiro on April 3, 1968. After graduating from high school, he joined Fujita Industries (later Bellmare Hiratsuka) in 1987. He played many matches as goalkeeper from 1989. The club won the champions in 1993 and was promoted to J1 League from 1994. However he could hardly play in the match behind Nobuyuki Kojima from 1994. In 1996, he moved to Avispa Fukuoka. However he could not play at all in the match behind Hideki Tsukamoto. In 1998, he moved to Japan Football League club Omiya Ardija. He played as regular goalkeeper in 1 season. In 1999, he moved to Regional Leagues club NTT Kyushu (later NTT Kumamoto) based in his local Kumamoto Prefecture. He retired end of 2000 season.

Club statistics

References

External links

1968 births
Living people
People from Yatsushiro, Kumamoto
Association football people from Kumamoto Prefecture
Japanese footballers
Japan Soccer League players
J1 League players
Japan Football League (1992–1998) players
Shonan Bellmare players
Avispa Fukuoka players
Omiya Ardija players
Roasso Kumamoto players
Association football goalkeepers